Mekinges Elizabeth Conner (1785 – ca. 1861) was a Lenape woman.

Little is known about Mekinges Conner considering her role in the history of Hamilton County, Indiana. Many articles have been written about her husband William Conner, a pioneer in the banks of the White River who worked side by side with the Lenape, establishing a trading post and fur trade. None of his prosperous business would have been possible without the help of Mekinges and her high status among the Lenape. As she was the daughter of an important Indian Chief, she had the influence to favor her white husband's business affairs.

Early life
Mekinges Elizabeth Conner was born in what is now the city of Anderson in Madison County, Indiana, in 1785. Her Indian name was "Ma cun chis" (me king ees), meaning "last born".  Her name was also spelled Mckinges; there is a street in Carmel, Indiana that bears her name: Mckinges Circle. Conner was the daughter of the Lenape chief William "Kik tha we nund", also known as Chief William Anderson (1740–1831), Head of the Turkey Clan of the Unami Delaware Indians. The town of Anderson was named after him. Her Mother was Mary "Ah Ke Ch Lung Un A Qua" from the Delaware Indians Turtle Clan. Her English name was Mary Anderson (1760–1825). Mrs. Conner lived with her parents until 1812 when she moved with her husband of 10 years four miles south of the town of Noblesville, Indiana, and east of the White River. The Delaware Indians, also known as Lenape, had a matrilineal line (the children belonged to the mother's clan) and it was common that married children lived in the same household as the mother.

Marriage
In 1802 she married a white man named William Conner (1777–1855) who was a fur trader in central Indiana. William Conner was also an interpreter at the Treaty of St. Mary's, Ohio in 1818.
On the day of the treaty Chief William Anderson, Mekinges Conner and her husband were present. The old chief put his trust in his son-in-law expecting the negotiations to favor the Delaware Indians. What happened was exactly the opposite. William Conner was the interpreter for Chief Anderson, but also persuaded and was an active participant for a profit. He was paid very well by the US Government with land and money. His explanation was that the removal of the Indians from Indiana was going to happen any way, so why not make money in the process.

The treaty of St. Mary's assured the Indian removals in Indiana, including Mekinges Conner and her six children. No one knows whether this was intentional on his part or if Mekinges wanted to leave Indiana. It is not clear if William Conner himself traveled with his Indian family turning back to Indiana half way to Missouri, or they traveled with his partner William Marshal and wife. Eight months after William Conner Indian family parted he married Elizabeth Chapman the 30 of November 1820, an 18-year-old white woman from Noblesville. She was the step-daughter of John Finch, daughter of his third wife Mehitable Brown Chapman. Judge John Finch also built the first mill and started the first blacksmith shop in Hamilton County, Indiana.

Family
Mekinges and William Conner had six children: John Conner (1802–1872), James Conner (1817-1872), Hamilton "Harry" Conner (1809-1887), Elizabeth Conner-Bullett (1818-1876), William Conner Jr.(1811-1887), and Nancy Conner (1815-1834) as testified under oath by George F. Conner at the Court of Hamilton County, State of Indiana. Data obtained from the "Abstract of Title" of a property built on land belonging to William Conner, currently located on Conner St., Noblesville, Indiana.

Mekinges's children remained with her and the Delaware Indians after she left Indiana. John and James became prominent Delaware chiefs.

Later life
When Mekinges left Indiana in September 1821, she supposedly carried her share of the business, and a promise from her husband Mr. Conner that if he received government land he would share it with his Indian children. William Conner and Mekinges had petitioned together for government land as a payment for his services to the United States Government during the Treaty of St. Mary's of 1818. He received the deed for the land in 1830. Upon his death in 1855 he left his entire estate of 6,000 acres to his second wife Elizabeth Chapman and their white children, excluding his Indian children and the promise he made to Mekinges nine years earlier. A suit was brought against the estate of William Conner and his white heirs by his Indian children at the Court of Hamilton County, State of Indiana, on 5 November 1855. The claim was "quieted" against the plaintiffs by Judge Laceb B. Smith at the Circuit Court of the US for the District of Indiana on 6 January 1863, leaving Mekinges's children with no part of William Conner's estate.

There is little information about Mekinges' life after she left Indiana with her people, the Lenape of the Delaware Nation. First she went to southern Missouri along the West fork of the White River until reaching the Wabash River. She crossed southern Illinois and camped at Fort Kaskaskias. Because of bad weather conditions Mekinges and her family had to remain at the fort until the spring. It is assumed that for the next two years Mrs. Conner and her children went to southern Arkansas, but when the tribe arrived in Kansas at the Delaware Reservation Mekinges and her younger children were with them, they remained there until 1930. She appears on the 1842 census of the Delaware Indians (No. 151) as "Muck-cun-chase". It is believed she died the 3 of July 1861, however there is some evidence she might have lived many years after 1861. There is a "Mu-cun-chus" in the census of 1862 (No. 473) age 73 born about 1779. Her Indian name was written in so many ways that is almost impossible to be certain she is the one on record. It is believed she was part of the Delaware Indians who moved from their Kansas home into Indian territory because her name "Macumchis" appears as a land owner who died in the Cherokee Nation.

Mekinges Conner was not only the daughter of an Indian chief but also the mother of two Indian chiefs.

Historical site
The cabin William Conner built for his first wife Mekinges and the Federal-style home he built for his second wife Elizabeth Chapman are located in the original site at the Conner Prairie Interactive History Park. The Federal-style house was added to the National Register of Historic Places in 1980.

References

1785 births
Native American people from Indiana
People from Anderson, Indiana
Lenape people
People from Hamilton County, Indiana
1860s deaths
19th-century Native Americans